The Mirandesa is a cattle breed from Portugal. The Mirandesa breed has the protected geographical status of DOC (Denominação de Origem Controlada) from the European Commission

Description

Head: wide neck, raised and prominent. Save remarkably thick and long, covering the base of the sticks of color and always a redhead. Horned with extreme afuscados, thin small-scale, acabanados and tips up and turned inside out, getting this level slightly higher than the topknot. Ears lined with long and abundant red hair. Source sub-concave, eyes touched. Head below eyes, short, broad and dry, right nasal bone and muzzle very short, black and superiorly bordered by a broad fringe of hair always white.
Neck: Short, thick with hook, at least in the bulls, soon falls under his lower lip and comes up to the knees, including overhangs.
Trunk: round side. Withers low. Ridge right, with red hair or white stripe. Rounded rump. Raised tail, short and well supplied.
Mammary system, developed and well set, with well-implanted teats of moderate size. The milk production often exceeds the intake capacity of calves during the first months of life but these run out in the following months until weaning.
End and uprightness: short and slender members below the knee and hock; the right hind and forelegs knees deflected inward. Thigh convex.
Color: Chestnut Retinta the bull, more or less dark brown, with clusters of pigmented centrifugal tendency in bulls and cows.
Format: animals are harmonious, lively but docile temperament, large size and compact form, the respiratory tract (mainly the girth instead of waist circumference).

Characteristics

Extension

The breed region is circumscribed almost exclusively to the Northeast Portugal in Bragança District.

External links
 http://autoctones.ruralbit.com/?rac=28&esp=1

Cattle breeds
Cattle breeds originating in Portugal
Portuguese products with protected designation of origin